Variações is a 2019 Portuguese biographical film about Portuguese singer and songwriter António Variações. It was, by far, the most watched Portuguese film in Portuguese theatres in 2019.

Cast
 Sérgio Praia - António Variações
 Filipe Duarte - Fernando Ataíde
 Victória Guerra - Rosa Maria
  - Luis Vitta
 Teresa Madruga - Deolinda de Jesus

References

External links 
 
 

Portuguese biographical films
2010s biographical films
Sophia Award winners
2010s Portuguese-language films